The Donegal Senior Hurling Championship is an annual hurling competition contested by top-tier Donegal GAA clubs. The County Final is usually played at O'Donnell Park in Letterkenny.

Setanta are the title holders (2022) defeating Burt in the Final.

History
Burt hold the most SHC titles of any club in the country, having passed out Waterford Senior Hurling Championship club Mount Sion's total of 35 a few years ago.

Honours
The trophy presented to the winners is the Munster Cup.

The winning club qualifies to represent their county in the Ulster Intermediate Club Hurling Championship. The winners can, in turn, go on to play in the All-Ireland Intermediate Club Hurling Championship.

List of finals

Wins listed by club

References

External links
 Official Donegal Website
 Donegal on Hoganstand
 Donegal Club GAA

 
Donegal GAA club championships
Hurling competitions in Ulster
Senior hurling county championships